was a Japanese shoegazing/dream pop band. Their first EP, Long Good Bye, peaked in the Oricon Albums Chart at #56 on the week of December 4, 2013. Their 2016 album “Ai no Yukue” peaked at #19 on Oricon Album Chart on December 14, 2016. "Time Lapse" was their last and most successful album, released on September 12, 2018. It peaked #14 on Oricon Album Chart. On May 27, 2019 the band announced they will be suspending activity.

The group was made up of Satō Chiaki (佐藤千亜妃) as vocals and guitar, A-chan (あーちゃん) on the guitar and keyboards, Shigeaki Taniguchi on the bass and Kon Nishimura on drums.

Discography

Albums 
eureka (February 6, 2013)
 (October 29, 2014)
 (November 11, 2015)
  (November 2, 2016)
  (September 12, 2018)

Mini albums
 (May 9, 2012)

EPs 
 (December 14, 2013)
 (April 29, 2015)

Demos
1st demo (2011, self-released)
 (September 12, 2011, self-released)

Singles
 (2012, self-released)
 (January 17, 2013)
 (September 9, 2014)
 (April 29, 2015)
 (June 29, 2016)
 (August 29, 2016)
 (December 13, 2017)

V.A. 
 (April 11, 2012)
『Yes, We Love butchers ～Tribute to bloodthirsty butchers～』 Night Walking (March 26, 2014)
CHATMONCHY Tribute ～My CHATMONCHY～ (March 28, 2018)
Takeshi Kobayashi meets Very Special Music Bloods (April 4, 2018)

References

External links 
 
 

Japanese alternative rock groups
Japanese indie rock groups
Shoegazing musical groups
Dream pop musical groups
Musical groups established in 2007
Musical quartets